Klinsky (masculine), Klinskaya (feminine), or Klinskoye (neuter) may refer to:
Klinsky District, a district of Moscow Oblast, Russia
Klinsky (rural locality) (Klinskaya, Klinskoye), several rural localities in Russia
Klinskoye, a Russian brand of beer by AB InBev
Klinski -

See also
Klin (disambiguation)